Robert Janyns (fl. 1438 - 1464) was an English gothic architect, not to be confused with Robert Janyns, Jr. He worked on All Souls College, the chapel of Merton College and the Divinity School, Oxford.

References

15th-century English architects
Gothic architects
Year of death unknown
Year of birth unknown
Architects from Oxford